Doctor Gorpon is a 1991 three-issue comic book mini-series published by Malibu Comics, created by Marc Hansen.

Plot
The story is about the eponymous supernatural monster killer that must pass on his legacy to a new generation. Doctor Gorpon finds such a prospect in a young rebellious teen named Doofus.

Collected edition
The series was collected into a trade paperback by NOW Comics:

Doctor Gorpon (96 pages, NOW Comics, July 2004)

References

External links
The Comic Book Work of Marc Hansen

1991 comics debuts
Malibu Comics characters